Robert A. Havern III (July 17, 1949 – July 19, 2014), was a Massachusetts politician who served in the Massachusetts House of Representatives and who represented the Fourth Middlesex District in the Massachusetts State Senate from 1991 to 2007.

Biography
Havern  attended Harvard where he played on the hockey team from 1970 to 1972.

Havern served as an Arlington Selectman from 1978 to 1986, and as a State Representative from 1987 to 1991.  He was elected to the Massachusetts Senate in November 1990. He resigned on August 22, 2007 to join the legal strategies lobbying firm Mintz Levin, as the president of its Massachusetts Government Relations Practice.

Fourth Middlesex district
The Fourth Middlesex District includes the towns of Arlington, Billerica, and Burlington.  It also contains six of eleven precincts in Lexington, and six of seven wards in the City of Woburn.

Recent election results
State Senate Fourth Middlesex 2004:
Senator Havern defeated Douglas M. Lucente (Republican) of Lexington. 
Havern (D): 50,139; 66%
Lucente (R): 25,572; 34%

Notes

External links
State Sen. Havern resigns
Bio from Mintz Levin Cohen

Democratic Party Massachusetts state senators
Democratic Party members of the Massachusetts House of Representatives
Massachusetts lawyers
Harvard College alumni
Harvard Crimson men's ice hockey players
Suffolk University Law School alumni
People from Arlington, Massachusetts
1949 births
2014 deaths
Mintz Levin people
20th-century American lawyers